is a private women's college in Hachiōji, Tokyo, Japan. The predecessor of the school was founded in 1934, and it was chartered as a junior college in 1967. In 1996 it became a four-year college.

The name was changed in 2015, as a mixed-gender Catholic university.

Since 2015, both men and women can major in children's culture or nursing.

There are some curricula which students who major in children's culture become qualified with the National Certified Childcare Workers to obtain a Teaching Licenses for kindergarten and elementary schools in Japan.  Students who major in nursing can earn the right to take the examinations to become a National Certified Nurse in Japan.

External links
 Official website 

Educational institutions established in 1934
Private universities and colleges in Japan
Universities and colleges in Tokyo
1934 establishments in Japan
Catholic universities and colleges in Japan
Former women's universities and colleges in Japan